Vánky is a surname of Hungarian origin. Notable people with the surname include:

Farkas Vánky, Swedish cardiac and thoracic surgeon at Linköping University Hospital
Kálmán Vánky (born 1930), Hungarian mycologist
Péter Vánky (born 1968), Romanian-born Swedish fencer

See also
Vanko